The Twenty-second Amendment of the Constitution of India, officially known as The Constitution (Twenty-second Amendment) Act, 1969, inserted new article 244A in the Constitution to empower Parliament to enact a law for constituting an autonomous State within the State of Assam and also to provide the autonomous State with Legislature or a Council of Ministers or both with such powers and functions as may be defined by that law.

The 22nd Amendment amended article 275 in regard to sums and grants payable to the autonomous State on and from its formation under article 244A. It also inserted new article 371B which provided for constitution and functions of a committee of the Legislative Assembly of the State of Assam consisting of members of that Assembly elected from the tribal areas specified in Part A of the Table appended to Paragraph 20 of the Sixth Schedule, and such number of other members of that Assembly as may be specified in the order.

Text

Constitutional changes
Section 2 of the 22nd Amendment inserted new article 244A in the Constitution to empower Parliament to enact a law for constituting an autonomous State within the State of Assam and also to provide the autonomous State with Legislature or a Council of Ministers or both with such powers and functions as may be defined by that law.

Section 3 of the 22nd Amendment amended article 275 in regard to sums and grants payable to the autonomous State on and from its formation under article 244A. Section 4 inserted new article 371B which provided for constitution and functions of a committee of the Legislative Assembly of the State of Assam consisting of members of that Assembly elected from the tribal areas specified in Part A of the Table appended to Paragraph 20 of the Sixth Schedule and such number of other members of that Assembly as may be specified in the order.

Proposal and enactment
The Constitution (Twenty-second Amendment) Bill, 1968, (Bill No.  113 of 1968) was introduced in the Lok Sabha on 10 December 1968. It was introduced by Yashwantrao Chavan, then Minister of Home Affairs, and sought to amend article 275 and insert new articles 244A and 371B in the Constitution. The full text of the Statement of Objects and Reasons appended to the bill is given below:

A motion was moved in the Lok Sabha on 20 December 1968, adopted on the same day and concurred in by the Rajya Sabha on 28 December 1968, to refer the Bill was to a Joint Committee of the Houses of Parliament. The Report of the Joint Committee on the Bill was presented to the Lok Sabha on 12 March 1969 . The Committee suggested certain amendments in the Enacting Formula and clauses 1 and 3 of the Bill. The Bill, as reported by the Joint Committee, was withdrawn on 2 April 1969, by leave of the House.

The Constitution (Twenty-second Amendment) Bill, 1969 (Bill No. 34 of 1969) was introduced in the Lok Sabha on 10 April 1969 . It was introduced by Chavan, and like the previous bill, sought to amend article 275 and insert new articles 244A and 371B in the Constitution. The Bill was considered and passed in the original form by the Lok Sabha on 15 April 1969, and the Rajya Sabha on 30 April 1969 The bill received assent from then President Varahagiri Venkata Giri on 25 September 1969, and came into force on the same day. It was notified in The Gazette of India on 26 September 1969.

Ratification
The Act was passed in accordance with the provisions of Article 368 of the Constitution, and was ratified by more than half of the State Legislatures, as required under Clause (2) of the said article. State Legislatures that ratified the amendment are listed below:

 Assam
 Gujarat
 Haryana
 Kerala
 Madhya Pradesh
 Maharashtra
 Mysore
 Nagaland
 Rajasthan
 Tamil Nadu
 Uttar Pradesh
 West Bengal

Did not ratify:
 Andhra Pradesh
 Bihar
 Jammu and Kashmir
 Orissa
 Punjab

See also
List of amendments of the Constitution of India

References

22
1969 in India
1969 in law
Indira Gandhi administration